In enzymology, an AMP nucleosidase is an enzyme that catalyzes the chemical reaction

AMP + H2O  D-ribose 5-phosphate + adenine

Thus, the two substrates of this enzyme are AMP and H2O, whereas its two products are D-ribose 5-phosphate and adenine.

This enzyme belongs to the family of hydrolases, specifically those glycosylases that hydrolyse N-glycosyl compounds.  The systematic name of this enzyme class is AMP phosphoribohydrolase. Other names in common use include adenylate nucleosidase, and adenosine monophosphate nucleosidase.  This enzyme participates in purine metabolism.

Structural studies

References

 

EC 3.2.2
Enzymes of known structure